We Are They Who Ache with Amorous Love is an album by the rock group Half Japanese, released in 1990.

Content
There are six cover songs, including "Gloria," a song by the band Them famously covered and rewritten by Patti Smith. Two songs were co-written with Daniel Johnston: "Titanic" and "Hand Without a Body."

Critical reception
Trouser Press wrote that "with a rotating stack of fellow noisemakers, Jad manages to deliver some quietly cogent (if unexceptional) performances ('The Titanic,' 'All of Me,' 'Three Rings,' 'Secret' and a few others), but a sizable chunk of the record is unlistenably indulgent nonsense, noisy improvs in the musical sandbox." Magnet counted the album as among the band's "most accessible, most listenable."

Legacy
Kurt Cobain of Nirvana ranked it his 37th favorite album on his top 50 favorite albums list, published in Journals.

Track listing

References 

1990 albums
Half Japanese albums
Ralph Records albums